Gary Biasillo ( Gari Biasillo) is the composer of the theme tune to the C64 computer game Target: Renegade, and the programmer of Basket Master C64 port, among others.

Games credited

FIFA 07 (2006), Electronic Arts, Inc.
NHL 2005 (2004), Electronic Arts, Inc.
NHL 2003 (2002), Electronic Arts, Inc.
NHL 2001 (2000), Electronic Arts, Inc.
Re-Volt (1999), Acclaim Entertainment, Inc.
NFL Quarterback Club '96 (1995), Acclaim Entertainment, Inc.
Onslaught (1991), Ballistic
Future Basketball (1990), Hewson Consultants Ltd.
Arkanoid: Revenge of Doh (1988), Imagine Software
Slayer (1988), Hewson Consultants Ltd.
Target: Renegade (1988), Imagine Software
Fernando Martín: Basket Master (1987), Dinamic Software
Joe Blade (1987), Players Software

Sources

Living people
Year of birth missing (living people)